This is a list of films which have placed number one at the weekend box office in Brazil during 2010 (Amounts are in Brazilian reais; 1 real is approximately equivalent to 0.64 US dollars).

References
 Filme B
 E-Pipoca

See also
List of Brazilian films

2010 in Brazil
Brazil
2010